August Michaelis (26 December 1847 – 31 January 1916) was a German chemist and discovered the Michaelis–Arbuzov reaction.

Michaelis studied at the University of Göttingen and University of Jena and became professor for chemistry at University of Karlsruhe in 1876, at the University of Aachen in 1880, and at the University of Rostock in 1890.

Works
 Repetitorium und Examinatorium der Chemie . Laupp, Tübingen 1850 Digital edition by the University and State Library Düsseldorf

References

1847 births
1916 deaths
19th-century German chemists
People from the Kingdom of Hanover
University of Göttingen alumni
University of Jena alumni
Academic staff of the Karlsruhe Institute of Technology
Academic staff of RWTH Aachen University
Academic staff of the University of Rostock
20th-century German chemists